Skala is a neighborhood in Larnaca, Cyprus.

One map puts the center of Skala's seashore around 100 meters south of Larnaca Castle, at Lala Moustafa Pasa Street.

History
An article in the Dom Research Center-KURI Journal said that "Orthodox Christian Gypsies were also forcibly moved by the Turkish-Cypriot government from the area around Iskele to form a new community in Yeni Iskele or Skala".

References

See also
Lala Kara Mustafa Pasha
Dom people

Larnaca
Romani communities in Asia
Romani communities in Europe
Romani in Cyprus